Katharine Hepburn (1907–2003) was an American actress in film, stage, and television. Her career spanned 67 years through eight decades (1928–1995), during which she was honored with many of the industry's top awards. 

In 2000, at age 93 she was named by the American Film Institute as the greatest female star of Classic  Hollywood cinema.

Awards synopsis
Hepburn was nominated for a total of 12 Academy Awards for Best Actress, and won four–the record number of wins for a performer. She received two awards and five nominations from the British Academy Film Awards, one award and six nominations from the Emmy Awards, eight Golden Globe nominations, and two Tony Award nominations. 

She also won awards from the Cannes Film Festival, Venice Film Festival, and Montréal World Film Festival; the New York Film Critics Circle Awards and the Kansas City Film Critics Circle Awards; the People's Choice Awards, the Laurel Awards, the Golden Apple Awards, the American Movie Awards, the American Comedy Awards, and the David di Donatello Awards.

Hepburn was inducted into the American Theater Hall of Fame in 1979. She also won a Lifetime Achievement Award from the Screen Actors Guild in 1979, and received the Kennedy Center Honors, which recognize a lifetime of accomplishments in the arts, in 1990. Outside of acting, Hepburn also received recognition from the American Humanist Association and the Council of Fashion Designers of America.

Hepburn won four Academy Awards, the record number for a performer, and received a total of 12 Oscar nominations for Best Actress—a number surpassed only by Meryl Streep. Hepburn also holds the record for the longest time span between first and last Oscar nominations, at 48 years. International awards from the Cannes Film Festival, Venice Film Festival, the New York Film Critics Circle Awards, the People's Choice Awards, and others. Hepburn was inducted into the American Theater Hall of Fame in 1979. She also won a Lifetime Achievement Award from the Screen Actors Guild in 1979 and received the Kennedy Center Honors, which recognize a lifetime of accomplishments in the arts, in 1990.

Recognitions

Golden Globe Awards
The Golden Globe Award is an accolade bestowed by the 93 members of the Hollywood Foreign Press Association (HFPA) recognizing excellence in film and television, both domestic and foreign. Hepburn has received eight nominations, including one in Best Actress in a Comedy or Musical, six from Best Actress in a Drama, and one from Best Actress in a Miniseries or Television Film. These three categories are awarded for the best performance by a leading actress in its category, respectively.

Grammy Awards
The Grammy Awards, is an annual award show presented by The Recording Academy to recognize achievements in the music industry. The ceremonial event was first held on May 4, 1959.

Emmy Awards
The Primetime Emmy Award is an American accolade bestowed by the Academy of Television Arts & Sciences in recognition of excellence in American prime time television programming. First given in 1949, the award was originally referred to as simply the Emmy Awards or Emmy.

Tony Award
The Antoinette Perry Award for Excellence in Broadway Theatre, more commonly known informally as the Tony Award, recognizes achievement in live Broadway theatre. The awards are presented by the American Theatre Wing and The Broadway League.

Screen Actors Guild Awards

Festival awards

Critics awards

People's Choice Awards

Laurel Awards

Golden Apple Awards

Other

Noted

See also 
 Katharine Hepburn film and theatre credits

References

Notes

Hepburn, Katharine
Katharine Hepburn